The Younger Dryas impact hypothesis (YDIH) or Clovis comet hypothesis is a speculative attempt to explain the onset of the Younger Dryas (YD) as an alternative to the long-standing and widely accepted cause due to a significant reduction or shutdown of the North Atlantic "Conveyor" in response to a sudden influx of freshwater from Lake Agassiz and deglaciation in North America. The YDIH posits that fragments of a large (more than 4 kilometers in diameter), disintegrating asteroid or comet struck North America, South America, Europe, and western Asia around 12,850 years ago, coinciding with the beginning of the Younger Dryas cooling event. Advocates proposed the existence of a Younger Dryas boundary (YDB) layer that can be identified by materials they interpret as evidence of multiple meteor air bursts and/or impacts across a large fraction of Earth’s surface. Some YDIH proponents have also proposed that this event triggered extensive biomass burning, a brief impact winter and the Younger Dryas abrupt climate change, contributed to extinctions of late Pleistocene megafauna, and resulted in the end of the Clovis culture. Members of a group known as the Comet Research Group are the primary advocates for the impact hypothesis. The role—if any—of comets in bringing about the start of the Younger Dryas has been rejected by most subject matter experts.

Comet research group 
Members of this group have been criticized for promoting pseudoscience, pseudoarchaeology, and pseudohistory, engaging in cherry-picking of data based on confirmation bias, seeking to persuade via the bandwagon fallacy, and even engaging in intentional misrepresentations of archaeological and geological evidence. For example, physicist Mark Boslough, a specialist in planetary impact hazards and asteroid impact avoidance, has pointed out many problems with the credibility and motivations of individual CRG researchers and as well as with their specific claims for evidence in support of the YDIH and/or the effects of meteor air bursts or impact events on ancient settlements, people, and environments.

Many doubts have been raised about several of the CRG's other claims. Image forensics expert Elisabeth Bik discovered evidence for digital alteration of images used as evidence for the claim that the vilage of Tall el-Hammam was engulfed by an airburst. CRG members initially denied tampering with the photos but eventually published a correction in which they admitted to inappropriate image manipulation. Subsequent concerns that have been brought up in PubPeer have not yet been addressed by the CRG, including discrepancies between claimed blast wave direction compared to what the images show, unavailability of original image data to independent researchers, lack of supporting evidence for conclusions, inappropriate reliance on young Earth creationist literature, misinformation about the Tunguska explosion, and another uncorrected example of an inappropriately altered image. On February 15, 2023, the following editor’s note was posted on this paper, "Readers are alerted that concerns raised about the data presented and the conclusions of this article are being considered by the Editors. A further editorial response will follow the resolution of these issues."

Evidence 

Proponents believe that certain microscopic debris is evidence of impact and that "black mats" of sediment are evidence of widespread fires. They contend that extinction of megafauna was synchronous with associated effects on prehistoric human societies. They say that their observations and interpretations cannot be adequately explained by volcanic, anthropogenic, or other natural processes. They argue that there is a synchronous Younger Dryas boundary layer that should be used as a local, or even global stratigraphic marker. Archaeologist Stuart J Fiedel has remarked that "The bolide and its effects have been characterized inconsistently from one paper to the next, which makes this hypothesis difficult to refute."

Hypothetical impact markers 
Proponents have reported materials including nanodiamonds, metallic microspherules, carbon spherules, magnetic spherules, iridium, platinum, platinum/palladium ratios, charcoal, soot, and fullerenes enriched with helium-3 that they interpret as evidence for an impact event that marks the beginning of the Younger Dryas. One of the most widely publicized discoveries (nanodiamonds in Greenland) has never been verified and is disputed.

Some scientists have asserted that the carbon spherules originated as fungal structures and/or insect fecal pellets, and contained modern contaminants and that the claimed nanodiamonds are actually misidentified graphene and graphene/graphane oxide aggregates. Iridium, magnetic minerals, microspherules, carbon, and nanodiamonds are all subject to differing interpretations as to their nature and origin, and may be explained in many cases by purely terrestrial or non-catastrophic factors. An analysis of a similar Younger Dryas boundary layer in Belgium yielded carbon crystalline structures such as nanodiamonds, but the authors concluded that they also did not show unique evidence for a bolide impact. One group of researchers also reported they were unable to replicate platinum group metals in the boundary layer, despite reporting enhanced Iridium concentrations up to >300% of background in 2 of their samples. Another group was unable to confirm prior claims of magnetic particles and microspherules in 2009, Other studies involving YDIH proponents found concentrations of magnetic spherules but not all were associated with the YDB and not all were attributed to an ET event.

"Black mats" 
The evidence given by proponents of a bolide or meteorite impact event includes "black mats", or strata of organic-rich soil that have been identified at about 50 archaeological sites across North America. Using statistical analysis and modeling, James P. Kennett and others concluded that widely separated organic-rich layers, including black mats, were deposited synchronously across multiple continents as an identifiable Younger Dryas boundary layer. In 2019, Jorgeson and others tested this conclusion with the simulation of radiocarbon ages. They accounted for measurement error, calibration uncertainty, "old wood" effects, and laboratory measurement biases, and compared against the dataset of radiocarbon ages for the Laacher See eruption. They found the Laacher See 14C dataset to be consistent with expectations of synchroneity. They found the Younger Dryas boundary layer 14C dataset to be inconsistent with the expectations for its synchroneity, and the synchronous global deposition of the hypothesized Younger Dryas boundary layer to be extremely unlikely.

Marlon et al. suggest that wildfires were a consequence of rapid climate change. Radiocarbon dating, microscopy of paleobotanical samples, and analytical pyrolysis of fluvial sediments in Arlington Canyon on Santa Rosa Island by another group found no evidence of lonsdaleite or impact-induced fires. Research published in 2012 has shown that the so-called "black mats" are easily explained by typical earth processes in wetland environments. The study of black mats, that are common in prehistorical wetland deposits which represent shallow marshlands, that were from 6000 to 40,000 years ago in the southwestern USA and Atacama Desert in Chile, showed elevated concentrations of iridium and magnetic sediments, magnetic spherules and titanomagnetite grains. It was suggested that because these markers are found within or at the base of black mats, irrespective of age or location, they likely arise from processes common to wetland systems and not as a result of catastrophic bolide impacts.

Researchers have also criticized the conclusions of various studies for incorrect age-dating of the sediments, contamination by modern carbon, inconsistent hypothesis that made it difficult to predict the type and size of bolide, lack of proper identification of lonsdaleite, confusing an extraterrestrial impact with other causes such as fire, and for inconsistent use of the carbon spherule "proxy". Naturally occurring lonsdaleite has also been identified in non-bolide diamond placer deposits in the Sakha Republic.

Extinction of megafauna 
There is evidence that the megafaunal extinctions that occurred across northern Eurasia, North America, and South America at the end of the Pleistocene were not synchronous. The extinctions in South America appear to have occurred at least 400 years after the extinctions in North America. The extinction of woolly mammoths in Siberia also appears to have occurred later than in North America. A greater disparity in extinction timings is apparent in island megafaunal extinctions that lagged nearby continental extinctions by thousands of years; examples include the survival of woolly mammoths on Wrangel Island, Russia, until 3700 BP, and the survival of ground sloths in the Antilles, the Caribbean, until 4700 cal BP. The Australian megafaunal extinctions occurred approximately 30,000 years earlier than the hypothetical Younger Dryas event.

The megafaunal extinction pattern observed in North America poses a problem for the bolide impact scenario since it raises the question of why large mammals should be preferentially exterminated over small mammals or other vertebrates. Additionally, some extant megafaunal species such as bison and brown bear seem to have been little affected by the extinction event, while the environmental devastation caused by a bolide impact would not be expected to discriminate. Also, it appears that there was a collapse in North American megafaunal population from 14,800 to 13,700 BP, well before the date of the hypothetical extraterrestrial impact, possibly from anthropogenic activities, including hunting.

A group in the Netherlands examined carbon-14 dates for charcoal particles that showed wildfires occurred well after the proposed impact date, and the glass-like carbon was produced by wildfires and no lonsdaleite was found. Research at the Atacama Desert in Chile showed that silicate surface glasses were formed during at least two distinct periods at the end of the Pleistocene, separated by several hundred years.

Impact on human societies 
A study of Paleoindian demography found no evidence of a population decline among the Paleoindians at 12,900 ± 100 BP, which was inconsistent with predictions of an impact event. They suggested that the hypothesis would probably need to be revised.  A critique of the Buchanan paper concluded that these results were an insensitive, low-fidelity population proxy incapable of detecting demographic change. The authors of a subsequent paper described three approaches to population dynamics in the Younger Dryas in North America, and concluded that there had been a significant decline and/or reorganisation in human population early in this period. The same paper also shows an apparent resurgence in population and/or settlements in the later Younger Dryas. A 2022 study by an independent group presents genomic evidence that a previously unidentified pre-18,000 BP South American population suffered a major disruption at the Younger Dryas onset, resulting in a significant loss of lineages and a Y chromosome bottleneck.

Hiawatha crater 

A 2018 paper reported the discovery of an impact crater under the Hiawatha Glacier in Greenland of unknown age. Kurt Kjær, the lead author of the paper, speculated that it might date to the Pleistocene (2.58 million to 11,700 years ago), and mentioned a possible connection to the Younger Dryas.

However, in 2022 the crater was dated to around 58 million years ago, the late Paleocene, using Argon–argon dating combined with uranium–lead dating of shocked zircon crystals.

Other explanations 

A number of other hypotheses have been put forward about the cause of the Younger Dryas climate event.

Mainstream explanation 

The most widely accepted is that it began because of a significant reduction or shutdown of the North Atlantic "Conveyor" – which circulates warm tropical waters northward – as the consequence of deglaciation in North America. Geological evidence for such an event is not fully secure, but recent work has identified a pathway along the Mackenzie River that would have spilled fresh water from Lake Agassiz into the Arctic and thence into the Atlantic. The global climate would then have become locked into the new state until freezing removed the fresh water "lid" from the North Atlantic.

Other alternatives 

Another hypothesis suggests instead that the jet stream shifted northward in response to the melting of the North American ice sheet, which brought more rain to the North Atlantic, which freshened the ocean surface enough to slow the thermohaline circulation.

Another proposed cause has been volcanic activity. However, this has been challenged recently due to improved dating of the most likely suspect, the Laacher See volcano. In 2021, research by Frederick Reinig et al. precisely dated the eruption to 200 ± 21 years before the onset of the Younger Dryas, therefore ruling it out as a culprit. The same study also concluded that the onset took place synchronously over the entire North Atlantic and Central European region. A press release from the University of Mainz stated, "Due to the new dating, the European archives now have to be temporally adapted. At the same time, a previously existing temporal difference to the data from the Greenland ice cores was closed."

History 

In 2001, Richard Firestone and William Topping published their first version of the YDIH, "Terrestrial Evidence of a Nuclear Catastrophe in Paleoindian Times" in Mammoth Trumpet, a newsletter of the Center for the Study of the First Americans. They  proposed that "the entire Great Lakes region (and beyond) was subjected to a particle bombardment and a catastrophic nuclear radiation..." They argue that this cataclysm generated a shock wave that gouged out the Carolina Bays and reset the radiocarbon clock. Most geologists today interpret the Carolina bays as relict geomorphological features that developed via various eolian and lacustrine processes.  Multiple lines of evidence, e.g. radiocarbon dating, optically stimulated luminescence dating, and palynology, indicate that the Carolina bays predate the start of the Holocene. Fossil pollen recovered from cores of undisturbed sediment taken from various Carolina bays in North Carolina by Frey, Watts,  and Whitehead document the presence of full glacial pollen zones within the sediments filling some Carolina bays.  The range of dates can be interpreted that Carolina bays were either created episodically over the last tens of thousands of years or were created at time over a hundred thousand years ago and have since been episodically modified. Recent work by the U.S. Geological Survey has interpreted the Carolina bays as relict thermokarst lakes that have been modified by eolian and lacustrine processes. Modern thermokarst lakes are common today around Barrow (Alaska), and the long axes of these lakes are oblique to the prevailing wind direction.

In 2006, The Cycle of Cosmic Catastrophes: How a Stone-Age Comet Changed the Course of World Culture, a trade book by Richard Firestone, Allen West and Simon Warwick-Smith, was published by Inner Traditions – Bear & Company and marketed in the category of Earth Changes. It proposed that a large meteor air burst or impact of one or more comets initiated the Younger Dryas cold period about 12,900 BP calibrated (10,900 14C uncalibrated) years ago.

In May 2007, at a meeting of the American Geophysical Union in Acapulco, Firestone, West, and around twenty other scientists made their first formal presentation of the hypothesis. Later that year, the group published a paper in the Proceedings of the National Academy of Sciences (PNAS) that suggested the impact event may have led to an immediate decline in human populations in North America. Since this paper was considered too controversial for standard peer review, it was handled by a specially selected 'personal editor' who was friendly to the hypothesis.

In 2008, C. Vance Haynes Jr. published data to support the synchronous nature of the black mats, emphasizing that independent analysis of other Clovis sites was required to support the hypothesis. He was skeptical of the bolide impact as the cause of the Younger Dryas and associated megafauna extinction but concluded "... something major happened at 10,900 YBP (14C uncalibrated) that we have yet to understand." The first debate between proponents and skeptics was held at the 2008 Pecos Conference in Flagstaff, Arizona.

In 2009, a paper in the journal Science asserted that nanodiamonds were evidence for a swarm of carbonaceous chondrites or comet fragments from air burst(s) or impact(s) that set parts of North America on fire, caused the extinction of most of the megafauna in North America, and led to the demise of the Clovis culture. A special debate-style session was convened at the 2009 AGU Fall Meeting in which skeptics and supporters alternated in giving presentations.

In 2010, astronomer William Napier published a model suggesting that fragments of a comet—initially 50 to 100 kilometers in diameter—could have been responsible for such an impact, and that the Taurid complex is formed of the remaining debris.

In 2011, a group of scientists challenged the Younger Dryas impact hypothesis on the basis that most of the conclusions could not be reproduced and were a misinterpretation of data. Skepticism increased when it was reported that one of the lead authors of the original paper had practiced geophysics without a license. Around that time, other articles stated that no nanodiamonds were found and that the supposed carbon spherules could be fungus or insect feces and included modern contaminants. In response, in June 2013 some of the original proponents published a re-evaluation of spherules from eighteen sites worldwide that they interpret as supporting their hypothesis.

In 2012, another paper in  offered evidence of impact glass that resulted from the impact of a meteorite. Another group of scientists reported evidence supporting a modified version of the hypothesis—involving a fragmented comet or asteroid—was found in lake bed cores dating to 12,900 YBP from Lake Cuitzeo in Guanajuato, Mexico. It included nanodiamonds (including the hexagonal form called lonsdaleite), carbon spherules, and magnetic spherules. Multiple hypotheses were examined to account for these observations, though none were believed to be terrestrial. Lonsdaleite occurs naturally in asteroids and cosmic dust and as a result of extraterrestrial impacts on Earth. Lonsdaleite has also been made artificially in laboratories.

In 2013, scientists reported a hundredfold spike in the concentration of platinum in Greenland ice cores that are dated to 12,890 YBP with 5 year accuracy. They attribute this platinum anomaly to the likely impact of a large (~0.8 km) iron-rich meteorite locally onto Greenland's ice, which would have been "unlikely to result in an airburst or trigger wide wildfires proposed by the  impact hypothesis." But they write that the large Pt anomaly "hints for an extraterrestrial source of Pt". An alternative suggestion is that the Greenland Pt anomaly was caused by a small local iron meteorite fall without any widespread consequences, but this is disputed by the paper's authors who say that a global platinum anomaly is expected due to the ~ 20 year lifetime of the platinum signal.

In 2016, a report on further analysis of Younger Dryas boundary sediments at nine sites found no evidence of an extraterrestrial impact at the Younger Dryas boundary.

In 2017, Comet Research Group scientists reported a Pt anomaly at eleven continental sites dated to the Younger Dryas, which is linked with the Greenland Platinum anomaly.

In 2018, two papers were published by the Comet Research Group dealing with an "extraordinary biomass-burning episode" associated with the Younger Dryas Impact. However, these claims of extraordinary fires are disputed.

In 2019, Comet Research Group scientists reported evidence in sediment layers with charcoal and pollen assemblages both indicating major disturbances at Pilauco Bajo, Chile in sediments dated to 12,800 BP. This included rare metallic spherules, melt glass and nanodiamonds thought to have been produced during airbursts or impacts. Pilauco Bajo is the southernmost site where evidence of the Younger Dryas impacts has been reported. This has been interpreted as evidence that a strewn field from the Younger Dryas impact event may have affected at least 30% of Earth's radius. Also in 2019, analysis of age-dated sediments from a long-lived pond in South Carolina showed not just an overabundance of platinum but a platinum/palladium ratio inconsistent with a terrestrial origin, as well as an overabundance of soot and a decrease in fungal spores associated with the dung of large herbivores, suggesting large-scale regional wildfires and at least a local decrease in ice age megafauna.

In 2019, a South African team consisting of Francis Thackeray, Louis Scott and Philip Pieterse announced the discovery of a platinum (Pt) spike in peat deposits at Wonderkrater, an artesian spring site in South Africa in the Limpopo Province, near the town of Mookgophong (formerly Naboomspruit) situated between Pretoria and Polokwane. The spike in platinum was documented in a sample dated at 12,744 years BP (calibrated) preceding a decline in a paleo-temperature index based on multivariate analysis of pollen spectra. This drop in temperature is associated with the Younger Dryas. The Wonderkrater platinum spike is in marked contrast to the almost constant low Pt concentrations in adjacent levels. It is consistent with the Younger Dryas Impact Hypothesis and is the first of its kind in Africa, supplementing evidence for platinum anomalies at more than 25 other sites in the world.

Thackeray and his colleagues recognise that Terminal Pleistocene megafaunal extinctions in southern Africa (Antidorcas bondi, Megalotragus priscus, Syncerus antiquus, and Equus capensis) may be attributed to both environmental change and human predation within a period of time before and after 12,800 cal yr BP. However, on the basis of data presented in their study, they state that the consequences of a hypothesised  cosmic impact (including the dispersal of atmospheric dust) may have contributed to some extent to the process of extinctions not only in southern Africa, but also to that which occurred in North and South America as well as Europe, recognising synchroneity of Pt anomalies that has been cited in support the Younger Dryas Impact Hypothesis. It is noted that in parts of South Africa, the Robberg stone tool technology terminates at about 12,800 cal yr BP, co-terminus with the termination of the Clovis technocomplex in North America, but further work is required to assess this coincidence.

In 2019 research at White Pond near Elgin, South Carolina, conducted by Christopher Moore from the University of South Carolina and 16 colleagues, used a core to extract sediment samples from underneath the pond. The samples, dated by radiocarbon to the beginning of the Younger Dryas, were found to contain a large platinum anomaly, consistent with findings from other sites. A large soot anomaly was also found in cores from the site.

In 2022, a paper by Younger Dryas impact proponent James L. Powell investigated what he described as the "premature rejection" of the Younger Dryas Impact Hypothesis, saying that substantial evidence existed. In the review, Powell describes how, soon after the hypothesis was first published, a few scientists reported that they were unable to replicate the critical evidence and the scientific community at large came to reject the hypothesis. Powell argues that since then, many independent studies have reproduced that evidence at dozens of YD sites.

A 2023 article by planetary impact physicist Mark Boslough stated that "...the YDIH has never been accepted by experts in any related field" because it is "plagued by self contradictions, logical fallacies, basic misunderstandings, misidentified impact evidence, abandoned claims, irreproducible results, questionable protocols, lack of disclosure, secretiveness, failed predictions, contaminated samples, pseudoscientific arguments, physically impossible mechanisms, and misrepresentations.

In popular culture 
The impact hypothesis has been the subject of documentaries, including Mammoth Mystery on National Geographic Explorer (2007), Journey to 10,000 BC on the History Channel (2008), Survival Earth on  Channel 4 (2008), and Megabeasts' Sudden Death on  PBS Nova (2009).

Graham Hancock argued in his 2015 book Magicians of the Gods that the Younger Dryas comet destroyed the earth in a time cycle and that it was responsible for the Noahide flood myth. He inferred that this myth was widespread elsewhere on earth by comparing it with the flood mythology of other peoples. These claims were criticized as inaccurate by independent reviewers, including Jason Colavito, Michael Shermer, and Marc J. Defant. Hancock expanded on his claims in a subsequent book, America Before: The Key to Earth's Lost Civilization (2019), in which he claimed that the Younger Dryas catastrophe had wiped out all traces of a sophisticated Ice Age civilization in North America.

In 2017, a debate was held on the Joe Rogan Experience between proponents Graham Hancock, Randall Carlson, and Malcolm A. LeCompte and opponents Michael Shermer and Marc J. Defant. The week that the podcast was released, the network was reportedly averaging over 120 million downloads a month.

A 2021 episode of the Science Channel series Ancient Unexplained Files had a segment on the evidence from Abu Hureyra; geoscientist Sian Proctor also described the impact hypothesis as a whole.

See also 
 
 
 
 
 
 Tunguska event and Chelyabinsk meteor - two examples of meteors exploding in the atmosphere

Footnotes

References

Citations

Bibliography

Further reading 

 
 
 

 
 
 

Presentations of the American Geophysical Union

 
 

Mammoth Trumpet
An extensive series of articles was published in Mammoth Trumpet, the magazine for Texas A&M University's Center for the Study of the First Americans, featuring conversations with many  proponents and opponents:

External links 

 

Hypothetical impact events
Ecological theories
Extinction events